William George Pearson (1882 – 4 October 1963) was a British politician,  Conservative MP for Jarrow (UK Parliament constituency).

He was elected in the National Government landslide of 1931, but narrowly lost his seat to Ellen Wilkinson in the limited Labour recovery of 1935.

Notes

1882 births
1963 deaths
Conservative Party (UK) MPs for English constituencies
UK MPs 1931–1935